The Men's 200 metre butterfly competition of the swimming events at the 1987 Pan American Games took place on 14 August at the Indiana University Natatorium. The last Pan American Games champion was Craig Beardsley of US.

This race consisted of four lengths of the pool, all lengths being in butterfly stroke.

Results
All times are in minutes and seconds.

Heats

Final 
The final was held on August 14.

References

Swimming at the 1987 Pan American Games